Anne Keenan-Buckley in Portlaoise, County Laois)  is a retired Irish middle distance runner who was on the Ireland 1988 Summer Olympic team.

Running career
Keenan-Buckley competed at 1988 Olympics in the 3000 metres where she finished in 24th place.

In 2002, she won a team bronze medal at the 2002 IAAF World Cross Country Championships for the short race.

Administration career
From 2006-2012 Keenan-Buckley was the manager of the Ireland cross country team.

References

External links
 

Living people
People from Portlaoise
Irish female long-distance runners
Athletes (track and field) at the 1988 Summer Olympics
Olympic athletes of Ireland
Sportspeople from County Laois
People from County Laois
Year of birth missing (living people)